The discography of French recording artist Shy'm consists of seven studio albums, two compilation albums, and 35 singles. All six of her studio albums have reached the top ten position on France; Caméléon, released in 2012, managed to reach number one. In the same week that Caméléon was released, she released her only compilation album to date, L'intégrale (which is a box set of her first three albums). She has sold over 1,500,000 albums in France.

Albums

Studio albums

Compilation albums

Singles

As lead artist

Collaborations

References 

Discographies of French artists
Pop music discographies